, known in Europe as ESPN Winter Games Snowboarding 2, is a video game developed and published by Konami for PlayStation 2, Game Boy Advance, and Xbox in 2001-2002. It is a sequel to ESPN Winter X-Games Snowboarding released in 2000.

Reception

The PlayStation 2 and Xbox versions received "mixed or average reviews" according to the review aggregation website Metacritic. In Japan, Famitsu gave it a score of 32 out of 40 for the latter version, 30 out of 40 for the former version, and 19 out of 40 for the Game Boy Advance version.

See also 

 ESPN X Games Skateboarding
 ESPN International Winter Sports 2002
 List of snowboarding video games

References

External links
 

2001 video games
ESPN video games
Game Boy Advance games
Konami games
PlayStation 2 games
Snowboarding video games
Xbox games
Video games developed in Japan